David B. Goldstein is an American energy conservation policy expert.  
He co-directs the Natural Resources Defense Council's Energy Program. He currently serves as the board chair of the Institute for Market Transformation, which he co-founded in 1996 and as the board president of New Buildings Institute, for which he is also a founding director.

Life
He graduated from the University of California, Berkeley with a Ph.D. in Physics.

Awards
 2002 MacArthur Fellows Program
 Fellow of the American Physical Society
 Leo Szilard Award for Physics in the Public Interest
 2003 California Alumni Association’s Award for Excellence in Achievement

References

External links
"David B. Goldstein", Huffington Post
Author's blog
"The Roots of Energy Efficiency: SUVs and Refrigerators", Fora.tv

Year of birth missing (living people)
Living people
University of California, Berkeley alumni
MacArthur Fellows
Energy policy of the United States

Fellows of the American Physical Society